Guitar Forms is a 1965 album by Kenny Burrell, featuring arrangements by Gil Evans.  Evans' orchestra appears on five of the album's nine tracks, including the nearly 9-minute "Lotus Land". Three tracks are blues numbers in a small group format and there is one solo performance: "Prelude #2".

Reception
In 1966, the album was nominated for the Grammy Award for Best Instrumental Jazz Performance – Large Group or Soloist with Large Group, for Best Album Cover – Photography, and Gil Evans was nominated for Best Arrangement Accompanying a Vocalist or Instrumentalist for "Greensleeves".

Track listing
 "Downstairs" (Elvin Jones) – 2:53
 "Lotus Land" (Cyril Scott) – 9:38
 "Terrace Theme" (Joe Benjamin) – 4:02
 "Prelude No. 2" (George Gershwin) – 2:17
 "Moon and Sand" (William Engvick, Morty Palitz, Alec Wilder) – 4:16
 "Loie" (Kenny Burrell) – 3:19
 "Greensleeves" (Traditional) – 4:12
 "Last Night When We Were Young" (Harold Arlen, Yip Harburg) – 4:34
 "Breadwinner" (Burrell) – 3:00
 Alternative tracks included on the Verve Jazz Masters reissue:
 "Downstairs" – 4:11
 "Downstairs" – 3:06
 "Downstairs" – 2:38
 "Downstairs" – 2:36
 "Terrace Theme" – 2:59
 "Terrace Theme" – 3:58
 "Terrace Theme" – 4:09
 "Breadwinner" – 3:51
 "Breadwinner" – 3:49
 "Breadwinner" – 3:17
 "Breadwinner" – 3:04

Personnel

Combo
Kenny Burrell - guitar
Roger Kellaway - piano
Joe Benjamin - double bass
Grady Tate - drums
Willie Rodriguez - conga

Orchestra 
 Gil Evans - arranged & conducted
 Kenny Burrell - guitar
 Johnny Coles or Louis Mucci - trumpet
 Jimmy Cleveland & Jimmy Knepper - trombone
 Andy Fitzgerald - flute & English horn
 Ray Beckenstein - alto flute, flute & bass clarinet
 George Marge - English horn & flute or Richie Kamuca - tenor sax & oboe
 Lee Konitz - alto saxophone
 Steve Lacy - soprano saxophone
 Bob Tricarico - tenor sax, bassoon & flute
 Ray Alonge or Julius Watkins - french horn
 Bill Barber - tuba
 Ron Carter - double bass
 Elvin Jones & Charlie Persip - drums & percussion

Production
Creed Taylor – producer
Rudy Van Gelder – engineer

References

Kenny Burrell albums
Albums produced by Creed Taylor
Albums arranged by Gil Evans
Verve Records albums
1965 albums
Albums recorded at Van Gelder Studio
Albums conducted by Gil Evans